Vigilante rap, also known as V-rap or rap das milícias is a musical style developed in Brazil and whose lyrics, as opposed to gangsta rap, are about praising vigilantism and violent acts against criminals instead of criminal enterprise or gangster life.

In the milícias''' turfs, in Rio de Janeiro, v-rap is prevalent since any  endorsement of criminal enterprise is highly and violently discouraged and, thus, regular gangsta rap or proibidão (a kind of crude gangsta rap which emerged from the Brazilian slums) is not allowed to be played at parties or even in a citizen's house.

 Overview 
The v-rap songs often contain violent lyrics that deal with equally violent means of dispatching criminals, foul language and war chants from the milícias themselves. The musical style closely resembles that of funk carioca.

The style is mainly underground and yet not well documented by the media, but is viewed as an answer to the increased boldness of the favelas drugs lords who, from the beginning of the 2000s are playing even more anti-police gangsta rap as a provocation to the rival milicianos (a miliciano is a member of a milícia or an armed band of vigilantes).

Not infrequently, after the so-called bailes funks (favela gangsta rap parties), both drugs lords and milicianos'' face off in violent clashes where they exchange gunfire, often ending in death.

References 

Brazilian hip hop
Hip hop genres